The 1960 Army Cadets football team represented the United States Military Academy in the 1960 NCAA University Division football season. In their second year under head coach Dale Hall, the Cadets compiled a 6–3–1 record and outscored all opponents by a combined total of 222 to 95.  In the annual Army–Navy Game, the Cadets lost to the Midshipmen by a 17 to 12 score. The Cadets also lost to Penn State and Nebraska. 
 
Army guard Al Vanderbush was selected by the Central Press Association as a first-team player on the 1960 College Football All-America Team. He was also selected by the UPI as a second-team player.

Schedule

References

Army
Army Black Knights football seasons
Army Cadets football